St. Davids is a primarily residential neighborhood located in the eastern part of Wayne, Pennsylvania. It is served by its own train station. St. Davids is home to the main campus of Eastern University, a four-year, liberal arts university affiliated with the American Baptist Churches USA.

The community, on the Philadelphia Main Line, was named for St. Davids Church, an 18th-century church in the area that was in turn named for St. David, the patron saint of Wales (the country of origin of many of the area's first European settlers). The community's name is correctly spelled without an apostrophe.

Located near Interstate 476 (the "Blue Route") and Lancaster Avenue, St. Davids is about 15 miles from Philadelphia and has recently experienced a large growth spurt; however, it is still a quiet residential community which shares a ZIP code (19087) with the adjacent community of Wayne.

Notable people
Henry Sayen (1883–1965), cricketer

Richard Helms (1913-2002), former Director of Central Intelligence

Sources

External links

Radnor Township, Delaware County, Pennsylvania
Unincorporated communities in Delaware County, Pennsylvania
Unincorporated communities in Pennsylvania